Potassium channel tetramerization domain containing 8 is a protein that in humans is encoded by the KCTD8 gene.

References

Further reading